Duke Ai of Qi (reigned 9th century BC) was the fifth recorded ruler of the ancient Chinese state of Qi during the Western Zhou Dynasty.  His personal name was Lü Buchen (呂不辰), ancestral name Jiang (姜), and Duke Ai was his posthumous title.

Duke Ai succeeded his father Duke Gui of Qi as ruler of Qi. Duke Ai had a dispute with the marquis of Qi's neighbouring state Ji (紀).  King Yi of Zhou sided with Marquis of Ji and executed Duke Ai by boiling him to death. King Yi installed Duke Ai's younger half-brother Jing on the throne, later known as Duke Hu of Qi.

Ancestry

References

Monarchs of Qi (state)
9th-century BC Chinese monarchs